Philippe Morat (born 19 January 1937, in Saigon) is a researcher mainly in the field of tropical botany. He is a corresponding member of the French Academy of Sciences.

Biography 
Agricultural engineer from the Ecole nationale supérieure agronomique de Toulouse, he was admitted to the Institut de recherche pour le développement (IRD) in 1960 in the tropical botany section where he remained until 1986, successively in charge, master then research director during his assignments in Madagascar (12 years) and New Caledonia (9 years).

After obtaining a PhD from the University of Paris-Sud in 1972 on the origin of the savannas of south-western Madagascar, he turned his attention to taxonomy and phytogeography. Appointed Professor at the National Museum of Natural History and Director of the Phanerogamy Laboratory in 1986, he is also in charge of the National Herbarium. Correspondent of the French Academy of Sciences in 1999, section of Integrative Biology. Retired in 2006.

Scientific contributions 
Highlighting of the anthropic origin of the majority of the savannas of Madagascar. Bioclimatic synthesis of the Big Island. Inventories and taxonomic studies of tropical plant biodiversity on islands in the Indian Ocean (Madagascar, Mascarene Islands, Aldabra, Farquhar) and the Southern Pacific (New Caledonia, Vanuatu, French Polynesia, Wallis and Futuna). Development of an innovative methodology for the study of the structure and dynamism of their vegetation. Highlighting of their floristic affinities and the establishment of their vegetation and flora in relation to their geological history. Development of a GIS and an evolving taxonomic reference system in the form of a database that has been widely used to date. Vegetation map of New Caledonia.

Functions performed 
 Administrator of the Museum of the National Park of Guadeloupe
 Scientific adviser to the TAAF Museum (French Southern and Antarctic Lands), the DIRCEN (Direction des Centres d'Expérimentation Nucléaires), the Nancy Conservatory and Botanical Gardens.
 Vice-President of the Council of International Organisation for Plant Information (IOPI)
 Member of the Steering Committee of the Species Plantarum Programme: Flora of the world
 Honorary Trustee of the Missouri Botanical Garden
 Deputy Editor of the "Biology" reports of the French Academy of sciences
 Director of Flores:
 of New Caledonia
 of Madagascar and Comoros
 of Gabon
 of Cambodia, Laos and Vietnam

Publications 

 P. Morat et J.-M. Veillon. Contribution à la connaissance de la flore et de la végétation de Wallis, Futuna et Alofi, Bull. Mus. natn. Hist. nat Paris 1985, 4e sér.,7,sect.B. Adansonia, 259-330
 (en) P. Morat. Our knowledge of the flora of New Caledonia : endemism and diversity in relation to vegetation types and substrates. In the Terrestrial biota of New Caledonia. Biodiversity Letters London 1,1985 (3-4)72-81.
 (en) P. Morat et P.P. Lowry II. Floristic richness in the Africa-Madagascar Region : a brief history and prospective, Adansonia 1997, sér. 3, 19(1), 101-115.

Books 

 P. Morat. Les savanes du Sud-Ouest de Madagascar. Mémoires ORSTOM 1973-n° 68, 235 p.
 P. Morat, J. Koechlin et J.-L. Guillaumet, Flore et Végétation de Madagascar, Flora et Vegetatio Mundi. R. Tüxen. Ed. Cramer.1975, 687 p.
 P. Morat, G. Aymonin et J.-C. Jolinon, L’Herbier du Monde. Cinq siècles d’aventures et de passions botaniques au Muséum national d’histoire naturelle, Editions du Muséum / Les Arènes/ L’Iconoclaste, 2004, 240 p.

References

1937 births
People from Ho Chi Minh City
French biochemists
Members of the French Academy of Sciences
20th-century French botanists
Living people
21st-century French botanists